Chandra Mohan (24 July 1906 – 2 April 1949) was an Indian actor, known for his work in Hindi cinema in the 1930s and 1940s. He became known for his villainous roles in a number of critical and commercial successes.

Life and career 
Born in Narsinghpur in Madhya Pradesh, he was known for his large grey eyes, voice modulation and dialogue delivery. His eyes form the opening sequence in V. Shantaram's 1934 film Amrit Manthan, which was also his film debut. It was the first film made in the newly established Prabhat Films studio, and made both in Hindi and Marathi. Mohan received acclaim for his role as Rajguru and went on to establish himself as a noted villain of the time.

Mohan later appeared as Emperor Jehangir in Sohrab Modi's Pukar, as Randhir Singh in Mehboob Khan's Humayun and as Seth Laxmidas, in Mehboob Khan's Roti.

One of his last appearances was in Ramesh Saigal's 1948 film Shaheed. As Rai Bahadur Dwarka Nath, he played father to Ram, who was portrayed by Dilip Kumar. Mohan's character in this film initially supports the British Government but later favors the Freedom Struggle. Chandra Mohan's last movie was a religious movie Rambaan (1948), in which he played the role of the demon emperor Ravana.

He was the original choice to play the lead role in K. Asif's Mughal-e-Azam, but due to his untimely death the film had to be reshot after ten reels were shot with him as lead. The film was eventually released in 1960.

Death 
Mohan gambled and drank heavily and died penniless on 2 April 1949 at the age of 42 at his residence, Bilkha House, in Bombay.

Filmography
  Amrit Manthan (1934)
 Dharmatma (1935)
 Amar Jyoti (1936) 
 Jwala (1938) 
 Pukar (1939)
 Geeta (1940)
 Bharosa (1940)
 Apna Ghar (1942)
 Roti (1942)
 Nauker (1943)
 Shakuntala (1943)
 Taqdeer (1943)
 Draupadi (1944)
 Mumtaz Mahal (1944)
 Raunaq (1944)
 Humayun (1945)
 Ramayani (1945)
 Shalimar (1946)
 Shaheed (1948)
 Rambaan (1948)

References

External links

 

1906 births
1949 deaths
People from Narsinghpur
Indian male film actors
Male actors in Hindi cinema
20th-century Indian male actors
People from British India